The Decorah Municipal Bathhouse and Swimming Pool is located in Decorah, Iowa, United States.  Edward Novak of the Charles Altfillisch architectural firm in Decorah designed the facility in the Art Moderne and the International Style.  The project was a partnership between the local government and the federal Works Progress Administration (WPA).   The property on which it stands was donated by Luther College and a few local citizens.   The Fred Carlson Company of Decorah, which supervised its construction, hired unemployed men from the area as laborers.  The bathhouse "is the only remaining building from WPA projects of its style and significance in Iowa."  It was listed on the National Register of Historic Places in 2012.

References 

Sports venues completed in 1937
Moderne architecture in Iowa
Decorah, Iowa
Buildings and structures in Winneshiek County, Iowa
National Register of Historic Places in Winneshiek County, Iowa
Park buildings and structures on the National Register of Historic Places in Iowa
Works Progress Administration in Iowa
1937 establishments in Iowa